Dakhla-Oued Ed-Dahab is one of the twelve regions of Morocco. Before September 2015 it was known as Oued Ed-Dahab-Lagouira. It is situated in the disputed territory of Western Sahara, considered by Morocco to be the southern part of the country. The Polisario Front and other independence-seeking Sahrawis consider this to be a part of the Sahrawi Arab Democratic Republic. The United Nations and most countries do not recognize either Moroccan sovereignty over the area, or the self-declared Sahrawi republic.

The region covers an area of 50,880 km2 and had a population of 142,955 according to the 2014 census. The capital is the coastal city of Dakhla, formerly known as Villa Cisneros.

The region comprises two provinces:

Subdivisions

Dakhla-Oued Ed-Dahab consists of two provinces:

 Aousserd Province
 Oued Ed-Dahab Province

References

External links
 Portail officiel de Oued Ed-Dahab-Lagouira 

 
Geography of Western Sahara